Amrapali Dubey (born 11 January 1987) is an Indian actress appearing in Bhojpuri films. She played the lead role in the show Rehna Hai Teri Palkon Ki Chhaon Mein as Suman. She acted in Saat Phere and Maayka on Zee TV. She was also seen in Mera Naam Karegi Roshan. Dubey was in the Sahara One fiction show Haunted Nights.

In 2014, she made her debut in Bhojpuri cinema with a leading role in Nirahua Hindustani opposite her rumoured husband Dinesh Lal Yadav.

Early life
Dubey was born on 11 January 1987. She hails from Gorakhpur, Uttar Pradesh. Later, she shifted to Mumbai with her grandfather. She completed her education from Bhavan's College, Mumbai.

Filmography

 All films are in Bhojpuri, otherwise language noted.

Television
 Rehna Hai Teri Palkon Ki Chhaon Mein (2009-2010) as Suman
 Saat Phere (2008–09) as Shweta Singh
 Maayka (2009) as Tina
 Mera Naam Karegi Roshan (2010) as Reet
 Fear Files  in  Episode 67

See also
 List of Bhojpuri actresses

References

External links

 
 

Actresses from Uttar Pradesh
Indian television actresses
Living people
1987 births
Actresses in Bhojpuri cinema
Indian film actresses
People from Gorakhpur
21st-century Indian actresses
Actresses in Hindi cinema